Lance Sellers (born February 24, 1963) is a former American football linebacker. He played for the Cincinnati Bengals in 1987.

References

1963 births
Living people
American football linebackers
Boise State Broncos football players
Cincinnati Bengals players